Western Sydney Wanderers Football Club is an Australian women's football club based in the western region of Sydney, New South Wales, Australia. Founded in 2012, it is the affiliated women's team of the A-League team Western Sydney Wanderers. The team currently competes in the A-League Women, the top tier of women's football in Australia.

History
The announcement of the creation of Western Sydney Wanderers FC on 4 April 2012 by the then FFA CEO Ben Buckley was soon followed by the announcement of an associated women's team which would compete in the W-League. On 5 July 2012, Stephen Roche was announced the inaugural head coach for the team. On 17 July 2014, Norm Boardman was appointed head coach for the team. On 20 May 2016, Richard Byrne was appointed head coach, with Leah Blayney appointed assistant coach and Davide Del Giovine goalkeeping coach. In October 2017, former Western Sydney Wanderers player Catherine Cannuli and Ryan Doidge joined Byrne as his assistant coaches.

The Wanderers made finals for the first time in 2019/20. They finished fourth after the Home & Away season.

Led by youngster Courtney Nevin, a local product, Matilda midfielder Ella Mastrantonio and foreign stars Denise O'Sullivan, Lynn Williams and Dolan Medallist Kristen Hamilton, the Wander Women had an impressive season.

The Wanderers had an active supporter group called ‘The West End’ who attended a few games during the 2019/20 season.

Players

Current squad

Head coaches

Season by season record

  
 Bold denotes a current club player
 Italics denotes an active statistic

Broadcasting

Select games are broadcast via local radio station Hawkesbury Radio 89.9FM and streamed live on the station's website.

Records and statistics
 Record Win: 5–0 vs. Sydney FC, 20 December 2019
 Record Defeat: 10–1 vs. Perth Glory, 5 October 2014
 Most Goals by a Player in a Game: 3 – Kristen Hamilton vs. Brisbane Roar, 28 November 2019
 Most Wins in a Row: 3 – 14 November 2019 to 28 November 2019
 Longest Undefeated Streak: 6 matches – 14 November 2019 to 26 December 2019
 Most Goals In a Regular season: 7 goals:  (in the 2019–20 season) 
 Longest Period Without Conceding a Goal: 312 minutes – 7 December 2019 to 12 January 2020. Goalkeeper: Abby Smith

Most appearances

Caitlin Cooper holds the record for most league appearances with 69 as of 30 June 2021.

Last updated 24 November 2018

Leading scorers

Catherine Cannuli holds the record for most league goals with 8 (including finals) as of the start of the 2019/20 season.

Servet Uzunlar scored the first two goals in Wanderer’s history, be it men or women, when she netted a double in the Wanderers 3-2 loss against Adelaide United on 20 October 2012.

Last updated 16 March 2020
Competitive, professional matches only

See also
 List of top-division football clubs in AFC countries
 Women's soccer in Australia
 W-League (Australia) all-time records
 Australia women's national soccer team

References

External links
 Official club website

 
A-League Women teams
Western Sydney Wanderers FC
Association football clubs established in 2012
Women's soccer clubs in Australia
2012 establishments in Australia